This is a list of fictional doctors (characters that use the appellation "doctor", medical and otherwise), from literature, films, television, and other media.

Shakespeare created a doctor in his play Macbeth (c 1603) with a "great many good doctors" having appeared in literature by the 1890s and, in the early 1900s, the "rage for novel characters" included a number of "lady doctors". Solomon Posen had collected a list of books with "a doctors as a principal figure" which he says resulted in a list of over 10,000 works as of 2005.

Early cinematic and television representations of doctors typically characterized the practice of medicine as being "in safe (male) hands," with 90% of doctors on television through 1989 being male.

Literature

Film

Television

A-B

C-D

E-F

G-L

M-Q

R-Y

1-9

Anime

Children's television

Comics

Video games

Music

Internet

References

Doctors
 
Lists of physicians